The whaling foreman is in Faroese known as a grindaformaður. He is a central figure in the Faroese pilot whale hunt.

He has the following responsibilities in a hunt:

 He is responsible for organising the pilot whale drives
 He makes sure the word spreads when pilot whales are sighted close to land
 He makes sure that there are enough boats to drive the whales, and that there are enough people on shore to help out.

See also 
 Whaling in the Faroe Islands

External links 
 Whaling.fo - Website from the Faroese Government
 Information page from the High North Alliance (in favour of whaling)
 The North Atlantic Marine Mammal Commission
 Information page from the Campaign Whale campaign (against whaling)
 Museum of Natural History Faroe Islands Tagged pilot whales
 Torkilsheyggi Images from a pilot whale hunt in Gøtu 2006

Whaling
Economy of the Faroe Islands
Marine occupations